Laos made its Paralympic Games début at the 2000 Summer Paralympics in Sydney, sending just two representatives to compete in powerlifting. They ranked poorly, and the country did not participate in the next edition of the Games in 2004. Laos made its return to the Paralympics in 2008, with powerlifter Eay Simay as its sole competitor. Simay -greatly improving on his performance from 2000- won the country's first Paralympic medal, a bronze, by lifting 157.5 kg in the men's up to 48 kg category.

Laos has never taken part in the Winter Paralympics.

Full results for Laos at the Paralympics

See also
 Laos at the Olympics

References